Pyrenula nitida is a species of crustose lichen belonging to the family Pyrenulaceae.

It has a cosmopolitan distribution.

See also
 List of Pyrenula species

References

nitida
Lichen species
Lichens described in 1772
Cosmopolitan species